Holdemania is a Gram-positive, strictly anaerobic and non-spore-forming genus from the family of Erysipelotrichaceae, with two known species: Holdemania filiformis and Holdemania massiliensis.

See also
 List of bacterial orders
 List of bacteria genera

References

Further reading
 
 

Erysipelotrichia
Bacteria genera
Bacteria described in 1997